Antonin Nantel (17 September 1839 – 30 July 1929) was a Canadian Roman Catholic priest, teacher, school administrator, and author.

Born in Saint-Jérôme, Lower Canada, Nantel studied at the Petit Séminaire de Sainte-Thérèse and was ordained priest in 1862. He then started teaching at the Petit Séminaire de Sainte-Thérèse. He was the author of Nouveau cours de langue anglaise selon la méthode d'Ollendorff à l'usage des écoles, académies, pensionnats et collèges. From 1870 to 1886 he was superior of the Petit Séminaire de Sainte-Thérèse (and again from 1889 to 1895 and 1900 to 1905).

References 

1839 births
1929 deaths
20th-century Canadian Roman Catholic priests
People from Saint-Jérôme
French Quebecers
19th-century Canadian Roman Catholic priests